Tahoe Air was a United States airline founded by Mark Sando, who used Casino Express Airlines to fund their plane purchase. Tahoe Air offered jet flights directly out of South Lake Tahoe via the South Lake Tahoe Airport.

History
Scheduled passenger service was planned to be operated with McDonnell Douglas MD-80 jetliners; however, before any orders were placed, operations began with a single Boeing 737-200 jet, registered N233TM and operated by its parent company Casino Express. The lone aircraft was painted in the Tahoe Air livery. Tahoe Air made its first flight to Los Angeles (LAX) on June 25, 1999. On July 1, 1999, the airline started service to its second destination, San Jose, California (SJC).

The carrier offered low fares in a two class cabin with inexpensive upgrades. However, by October 1999, the airline had ceased operations, never having received any of its proposed MD-80 aircraft. The demise of Tahoe Air also marked the end of airline service to Lake Tahoe, which has not seen scheduled passenger air carrier flights since.

Destinations
South Lake Tahoe Airport (TVL) Hub
San Jose International Airport (SJC)
Los Angeles International Airport (LAX)

Fleet
1 Boeing 737-200 (N233TM)

See also 
 List of defunct airlines of the United States

References

External links

Tahoe Air 1999 Timetable
1999 Tahoe Air website
Photos of Tahoe Air

Airlines disestablished in 1999
Airlines established in 1999
Defunct airlines of the United States
Defunct companies based in Nevada
1999 establishments in Nevada